Robert Morwent was an Oxford college head in the 16th-century.

Morwent was educated at Magdalen College, Oxford.  He held the livings at Lydeard St Lawrence, East Knoyle and Bishopstone, Wiltshire. Morwent was President of Corpus Christi College, Oxford, from 1537 until his death on 26 August 1558.

Notes

References

1558 deaths
Alumni of Magdalen College, Oxford
Presidents of Corpus Christi College, Oxford
16th-century English people